Ladomedaeus is a genus of crabs in the family Xanthidae, containing the following species:

 Ladomedaeus fungillus Manuel-Santos & Ng, 2007
 Ladomedaeus serratus (Sakai, 1965)

References

Xanthoidea